Kerins is a surname. Notable people with the surname include:

 Alan Kerins (born 1977), Irish hurler
 Charles Kerins (1915-1988), American illustrator and painter
 Charlie Kerins (1918–1944), Chief of Staff of the IRA
 John Kerins (1858–1919), American baseball player
 Michael Kerins (*1952), Scottish Writer and Storyteller

See also
 Kerin
 Kerins O'Rahilly's, Gaelic Athletic Association club